Destination Tokyo is a 1943 black and white American submarine war film. The film was directed by Delmer Daves in his directorial debut, and the screenplay was written by Daves and Albert Maltz, based on an original story by former submariner Steve Fisher. The film stars Cary Grant and John Garfield and features Dane Clark, Robert Hutton, and Warner Anderson, along with John Ridgely, Alan Hale Sr. and William Prince.

Destination Tokyo has been called "the granddaddy of submarine films like Run Silent, Run Deep (1958), Das Boot (1981), and U-571 (2000)".

Produced during the height of World War II, the film was used as propaganda to boost morale back home and to entice young men to join the submariner service of the U.S. Navy.

Plot 
The story begins with a shipment of explosives on board a train. A captain is contacted about explosives on board a submarine.  On Christmas Eve, the submarine USS Copperfin, under the command of Captain Cassidy, departs Mare Island Naval Shipyard on a secret mission. The sailors wish one another a merry Christmas.  Some conduct themselves singing Christmas carols. The head cook becomes a designated Santa Claus and hands out Christmas presents.

At sea, Cassidy opens his sealed orders, which direct him to proceed first to the Aleutian Islands to pick up meteorologist Lt. Raymond, then to Tokyo Bay to obtain vital weather intelligence for the upcoming Doolittle Raid.

On the way, two Japanese aircraft attack; both are shot down, but one pilot manages to parachute into the water. When Mike, a Copperfin crewman, goes to pick him up, he is stabbed to death. New recruit Tommy Adams shoots the Japanese pilot, but because he was slow to react, Tommy blames himself for Mike's death and volunteers to defuse an unexploded bomb stuck under the deck.

When Mike is buried at sea, Greek-American "Tin Can" does not attend the service, which angers the other men until he explains that every Allied death causes him great pain. Meanwhile, Raymond, who lived in Japan, discusses how the Japanese people were led into the war by the military faction.

As the submarine nears Tokyo Bay, the Copperfin has to negotiate its way through defensive minefields and anti-torpedo nets. When a Japanese ship enters the bay, Cassidy follows in its wake. That night, a small party, including the ship's womanizer, "Wolf", goes ashore to make weather observations.

Meanwhile, Tommy is diagnosed with appendicitis. "Pills", the pharmacist's mate, has to operate following instructions from a book, using improvised instruments, and without sufficient ether to last throughout the procedure. The operation is a success, and "Cookie" Wainwright begins to prepare the pumpkin pie he had promised to bake for Tommy.

Raymond broadcasts the information the shore party has collected in Japanese in an attempt to avoid detection, but the Japanese are alerted and search the bay. The Copperfin remains undetected, allowing the men to watch part of the Doolittle Raid through the periscope. After recovering Raymond and his team, the submarine then slips out of the bay following an exiting ship.

Later, the Copperfin sinks a Japanese aircraft carrier and is badly damaged by its escorts. In desperation, after long hours and barrages of depth charges, Cassidy attacks, sending a destroyer to the bottom and enabling the crew to return safely home to Mare Island.

Cast

Production 
Production on Destination Tokyo began on June 21, 1943 and continued through September 4 of that year. Members of the cast spent time at the U.S. Navy's Mare Island Naval Shipyard in Vallejo, California, to familiarize themselves with submarine procedures and operations. The Wahoo was reported as missing in action after production on Destination Tokyo completed, sunk by Japanese aircraft in October 1943 while returning home from a patrol in the Sea of Japan. Commander Morton and all aboard were lost. Thanks to the efforts of the Wahoo Project Group, the wreckage was identified in 2006.

Previous versions of this article have confused the fictional Copperfin and its fictional mission with the Wahoo. The Wahoo did not go on its first patrol until August 1942, and could not have been involved in assisting the Doolittle Raid.

The existence of a submarine in Tokyo Bay relaying information to the Doolittle Raid is mentioned in the film Thirty Seconds Over Tokyo (1944), based on pilot Ted Lawson's memoir. There is a scene on the USS Hornet where Lawson (Van Johnson), fresh from a briefing on the latest positions of the barrage balloons over Tokyo, tells his friend Bob Gray (Robert Mitchum): "You know, the changes in those balloons threw me. Just think, a bunch of guys sweating all day in a sub down in Tokyo Bay, guys just like us, sneaking up at night to radio balloon positions..." The existence of such a submarine is not part of the participants' or historians' accounts of the raid. The Doolittle Raiders detailed description of the raid states that the barrage balloons seen on the raid were a negligible threat. There were many other possible intelligence sources for information given out at the briefings.

The model of the Copperfin used for filming was based on actual American submarines, except that, to confuse the Japanese, it was given equipment and apparatus that were used on numerous different types of subs. The film was accurate enough to be used by the Navy as a training tool for submariners.

The incident in Destination Tokyo in which the pharmacist's mate performs an appendectomy was based on an actual event which took place on the submarine .

Some filming of Destination Tokyo took place at Portuguese Bend on the Palos Verdes Peninsula.

For Destination Tokyo, Warner Bros. borrowed Cary Grant from Columbia Pictures in a swap which sent Humphrey Bogart to Columbia to make Sahara. Grant had turned down the role that Bogart eventually played, and Gary Cooper had turned down the role of the captain of the Copperfin that Grant played.

Reception 
Destination Tokyo premiered in Pittsburgh, Pennsylvania on December 15, 1943 as a benefit for crippled children. According to Warner Bros records Destination Tokyo earned $3,237,000 locally and $1,307,000 domestically.

In a contemporary film review of Destination Tokyo in The New York Times, reviewer Bosley Crowther had some reservations about the production values employed, "It has a lot of exciting incident in it; some slick, manly performances are turned in by Cary Grant (as the commander), John Garfield, Alan Hale and Dane Clark. But an essential rule of visual drama, which is to put within a frame only so much explicit action as can be realistically accepted in a space of time, is here completely violated. The Warners have a big but too extravagant action film."

In contrast, the review in Variety magazine, was effusive in its praise. "'Destination Tokyo' runs two hours and 15 minutes, and that’s a lot of film. But none of it is wasted. In its unspooling is crammed enough excitement for possibly a couple of pictures. Here is a film whose hero is the Stars and Stripes; the performers are merely symbols of that heroism. Here is a film of superbly pooled talents."

A later release of Destination Tokyo was a colorized version.

Awards and honors 
Screenwriter Steve Fisher received an Academy Award nomination for his original story for Destination Tokyo.

Destination Tokyo is recognized by American Film Institute in these lists:
 2001: AFI's 100 Years...100 Thrills – Nominated
 2006: AFI's 100 Years...100 Cheers – Nominated

Influence 
Inspired by Grant's role, a 17-year-old Tony Curtis forged his mother's signature to enlist in the United States Navy in 1943. Requesting submarine duty, he instead served aboard a submarine tender, . Later, as a top Hollywood talent, he co-starred with Grant as submariners in the 1959 World War II comedy Operation Petticoat, with Grant commanding the fictional USS Sea Tiger.

When the crew of a World War II-submarine in the 1951 movie Operation Pacific is given the treat of watching a movie, Destination Tokyo is screened. Footage from this film was reused in the 1959 film Submarine Seahawk.

According to his autobiography, Destination Tokyo influenced Ronald Reagan in his decision to accept the lead role of a World War II submarine captain in the 1957 movie Hellcats of the Navy.

References
Informational notes

Citations

Bibliography
 Eliot, Marc.Cary Grant: A Biography. New York: Aurum Press, 2005. .
 Evans, Alun. Brassey's Guide to War Films. Dulles, Virginia: Potomac Books, 2000. .
 Halliwell, Leslie. Leslie Halliwell's Film Guide. New York: Harper & Roe, 1989. .
 Maltin, Leonard. Leonard Maltin's Movie Guide 2013. New York: New American Library, 2012 (originally published as TV Movies, then Leonard Maltin’s Movie & Video Guide), First edition 1969, published annually since 1988. .
 Skinner, Kiron K. and Annelise and Martin Anderson. Reagan: A Life In Letters. New York: Simon and Schuster, 2004. .

External links 

 
 
 
 
 
 
 Historic reviews, photo gallery at CaryGrant.net

1943 war films
1943 directorial debut films
1943 films
American black-and-white films
American war films
1940s English-language films
Films about the Doolittle Raid
Films directed by Delmer Daves
Films scored by Franz Waxman
Warner Bros. films
World War II films made in wartime
World War II submarine films
Pacific War films